Asterix were an Indonesia alternative group whose members would later go on to change their name and form the first line-up of V2up. During the band's short-lived time under this name they recorded one album in 2006 and released the single "Andaikan". Hard rock journalist, RERE BEDE, noted the group as one of the, "333nine of proto funk."

Discography
asterixband (album) (2014)

References
RSR99 (2003). Soud of peak's: The Complete Headbanging History of Alternative. RadioGram.

Notes

Indonesian hard rock musical groups
Musical groups from Jakarta
2006 establishments in Indonesia